Nadezhda (Bulgarian language: Надежда) was a 20th-century torpedo gunboat of Bulgaria, the largest warship ever possessed by the Royal Bulgarian Navy. It was often referred to as a cruiser by her Bulgarian owners, a designation that might not be too far-fetched, considering there were indeed smaller torpedo cruisers in service with the European navies of the time, such as the Italian Folgore-class.

Construction

Nadezhda was made of steel, built by Chantiers et Ateliers de la Gironde in Bordeaux, France, and was launched in 1898. The warship displaced 715 tons and measured 67 meters in length, had a beam of 8.30 meters and a draught of 3.10 meters. She was powered by four boilers generating a speed of 18 knots and had a crew of 97. Her armament consisted of six guns (2 x 100 mm, 2 x 65 mm, 2 x 47 mm) and two 381 mm torpedo tubes.

Career
Nadezhda served as a royal yacht for the King of Bulgaria, the aft part of her deck house being converted into a lounge. In 1912 she ran aground, but was soon refloated and repaired. During the First Balkan War, she was disarmed due to her poor condition. Her guns were soon fitted again but were landed once more in 1915. In September 1918, she was taken to Sevastopol for repairs, but her crew abandoned her there in December that year.

References

1898 ships
Ships built in France
World War I naval ships of Bulgaria
Torpedo boats of the Bulgarian Navy
Military units and formations of the Balkan Wars